Juan Carlos “JC” Gutiérrez Acosta (born July 14, 1983) is a Venezuelan former professional baseball pitcher. He played in Major League Baseball (MLB) for the Houston Astros, Arizona Diamondbacks, Kansas City Royals, Los Angeles Angels of Anaheim and San Francisco Giants.

Career

Houston Astros
Gutiérrez was signed as an undrafted free agent by the Houston Astros on December 14, 2000. He played for Venezuelan Summer League in 2001 and 2002 before playing for their Rookie League teams in 2003 and 2004.

Gutiérrez has been a starter in the minor leagues. In the 2006 AA Texas League, Gutiérrez helped lead the Corpus Christi Hooks (Houston) to their lone Texas League championship. On August 17, 2007, he was recalled by the Houston Astros when Stephen Randolph was placed on the disabled list. On August 23, Gutierrez made his major league starting debut against the Washington Nationals, filling in for injured starting pitcher Roy Oswalt. He was sent back down to Round Rock on August 25 to make room for left-handed pitcher Troy Patton.

Arizona Diamondbacks
On December 14, 2007, Gutierrez was traded in a three-player deal which included pitcher Chad Qualls, infielder Chris Burke to the Arizona Diamondbacks in exchange for José Valverde.

He had a stint as the Diamondbacks closer in 2009 after Qualls was injured. He had 10 saves and was 8-for-8 after replacing Qualls.

Gutiérrez pitched in 20 games for the Diamondbacks in 2011 before he underwent Tommy John surgery in September.

Gutiérrez was released on October 13, 2011.

Kansas City Royals
On December 13, he signed a minor league contract with the Kansas City Royals.

After posting a 10.45 ERA in 20 2/3 innings—19 appearances/4 starts—across three levels of the Royals' Minor League system in 2012, Gutierrez re-signed with the Royals on a minor league deal for 2013 on Oct. 18, 2012.

On July 14, Gutiérrez was designated for assignment to make room for Wade Davis, who was reinstated from the paternity leave list. In 25 appearances, he went 0–1 with a 3.38 ERA, striking out 17 in 29.1 innings.

Los Angeles Angels
On July 24, Gutiérrez was claimed off waivers by the Los Angeles Angels of Anaheim. He was designated for assignment on November 27, 2013. On December 2, 2013, Gutierrez was non-tendered by the Angels, making him a free agent.

San Francisco Giants
He signed a minor league deal with the San Francisco Giants on January 6, 2014.  On March 29, 2014, he was added to the Giants roster. He was designated for assignment on November 20, 2014. On December 22, 2014, the Giants signed him to a minor league contract.

On June 1, 2015, Gutiérrez opted out of his minor league deal with the Giants.

Philadelphia Phillies
On June 8, 2015 Gutiérrez signed a minor league deal with the Philadelphia Phillies organization. On August 3, 2015, Gutiérrez was released by the Phillies.

Washington Nationals
He then signed with the Washington Nationals on August 11. He elected free agency on November 6, 2015.

On February 22, 2016, Gutiérrez re-signed with the Nationals on a minor league contract. On June 28, 2016, Gutierrez was released by the Nationals Triple-A Affiliate, the Syracuse Chiefs.

Leones de Yucatán
On July 13, 2016, Gutierrez signed with the Leones de Yucatán of the Mexican Baseball League. On February 9, 2017, he was released by Yucatán.

Saraperos de Saltillo
On May 2, 2017, Gutierrez signed with the Saraperos de Saltillo of the Mexican Baseball League. He was released on May 22, 2017.

See also
 List of Major League Baseball players from Venezuela

References

External links

1983 births
Living people
Arizona Diamondbacks players
Arizona League Royals players
Corpus Christi Hooks players
Greeneville Astros players
Houston Astros players
Kansas City Royals players
Lehigh Valley IronPigs players
Leones del Caracas players
Lexington Legends players
Los Angeles Angels players
Major League Baseball pitchers
Major League Baseball players from Venezuela
Martinsville Astros players
Mexican League baseball pitchers
Northwest Arkansas Naturals players
Omaha Storm Chasers players
People from Puerto la Cruz
Sacramento River Cats players
Salem Avalanche players
San Francisco Giants players
Syracuse Chiefs players
Round Rock Express players
Tucson Sidewinders players
Venezuelan expatriate baseball players in Mexico
Venezuelan expatriate baseball players in the United States